Matteo Alberti (born 4 August 1988 in Brescia, Italy) is an Italian footballer, who plays for US Governolese.

Career
He joined Queens Park Rangers from Chievo Verona youth side and made his debut in the opening game of the 2008–09 season in coming on as a substitute for Emmanuel Ledesma in the opening game of the season at home to Barnsley. When joining QPR, then chairman Gianni Paladini famously told fans that Alberti would score '100 goals a season'.

Alberti scored his first goals for QPR on 7 February 2009; a first half stoppage time strike against Nottingham Forest, closely followed by a second half opener on 48 minutes.

In July 2010 he was loaned to Lumezzane.

On 30 September 2011, Alberti was released by Queens Park Rangers by mutual consent.

References

External links

Matteo Alberti at Tuttocampo

1988 births
Living people
Italian footballers
Association football midfielders
Queens Park Rangers F.C. players
English Football League players
Italian expatriate footballers
Expatriate footballers in England
Italian expatriate sportspeople in England
Footballers from Brescia